Live 1977 is a live album by the Fall, first released in March 2000. Although the sound quality is poor and live documents of the Fall are plentiful, this album is of particular note as it is the earliest available recording of the group performing, apart from two tracks on the Short Circuit: Live at the Electric Circus compilation. It dates from December 1977, about six weeks after the group had recorded their debut single "Bingo-Master's Break-Out!" (which was not released until August 1978). It is the only release on which the early song "Hey! Fascist" may be heard, though it was reworked as "Hey! Student" and released on Middle Class Revolt 17 years later. Live 1977 also contains very early versions of the 1984 single and "Oh! Brother" and the song "Cop It", later found on The Wonderful and Frightening World Of... but retitled "Copped It". The group’s reworking of "Louie Louie", with John the Postman, is featured only on this recording. This was Tony Friel’s last performance with the band. After a couple of short-stay replacements, his place as bassist was taken by Marc Riley.

Track listing
"Psycho Mafia"
"Last Orders"
"Repetition"
"Dresden Dolls"
"Hey! Fascist"
"Frightened"
"Industrial Estate"
"Stepping Out"
"Bingo-Master's Break-Out!"
"Oh! Brother"
"Cop It"
"Futures and Pasts"
"Louie Louie"

Personnel 
The Fall
Mark E. Smith - vocals
Martin Bramah - guitar, backing vocals
Tony Friel - bass guitar
Una Baines - keyboard
Karl Burns - drums
John the Postman - vocals on "Louie Louie"

References 

The Fall (band) live albums
2000 live albums